Communication Arts is the largest international trade journal of visual communications. Founded in 1959 by Richard Coyne and Robert Blanchard, the magazine's coverage includes graphic design, advertising, photography, illustration, and interactive media. The magazine continues to be edited and published under the guidance of Coyne's son Patrick Coyne. Currently, Communication Arts (CA) publishes six issues a year and hosts six creative competitions in graphic design, advertising, photography, illustration, typography and interactive media and two Web sites, commarts.com and  creativehotlist.com.

History
The magazine was established in 1959. The first issue debuted in August 1959 as the Journal of Commercial Art. Among a number of innovations, it was the first U.S. magazine printed by offset lithography.

After Blanchard left to go into business by himself, Coyne, along with his wife Jean and a small staff, continued to write, design, and produce the magazine. Eventually, paid circulation increased to 38,000.

As of 2021, CA's paid circulation was about 21,000, down from 59,429 in 2009.

Competitions 
To generate additional income and editorial content, the magazine began an annual juried competition in 1960. Within a few years, the annual competition grew, and eventually segmented into four annual competitions: graphic design, advertising, photography, and illustration. A fifth competition, interactive, was added  in 1995. All the CA competitions are juried by creative professionals. The judges hand out awards based on creativity and not ROI.

Online presences 
CA was the first major design publication to launch a Web presence (Communication Arts) in 1995. In addition to showcasing creative work in visual communications, it included job listings. The jobs section grew, and was relaunched in 2001 as a standalone website,   Creative Hotlist.  These two websites receive approximately three million page views and 250,000 unique visitors per month.

See also
Émigré magazine
Eye magazine
Graphis Inc.
Print (magazine)
Visible Language

References

External links
 Communication Arts
 Creative Hotlist
 Communication Arts competitions

Visual arts magazines published in the United States
Bimonthly magazines published in the United States
Communication design
Design magazines
Graphic design
Magazines established in 1959
Menlo Park, California
Magazines published in California